Xisha District is the municipal district of Sansha, Hainan. It administers the islands and reefs of the disputed Paracel Islands and its sea areas, and is responsible for the islands and reefs and sea areas of the Zhongsha Islands. The People's Government of Xisha District is stationed in Yongxing Island (Yongxing Town Management Area).

Administrative divisions

References

Sansha
South China Sea
Paracel Islands
Territorial disputes of China
County-level divisions of Hainan